Evan Sanders (born Stevanus Alexander; November 8, 1981 in Biak, Papua, Indonesia) is an actor and a singer. He was a VJ for MTV Indonesia. In August 2008 he released his first solo album – Unforgettable Sebelah Mata. A song Takkan Terluka Lagi was promoting this album. The new album is DUA MATA, New single "For Once In Our Life" soundtrack My Last Love the movie.

Filmography

Film

References

External links 

1981 births
Indonesian male film actors
21st-century Indonesian male singers
Indonesian pop singers
Living people
VJs (media personalities)
People from Biak